Damoctocog alfa pegol, sold under the brand name Jivi is a recombinant DNA-derived, Factor VIII concentrate medication used to treat hemophilia A.

The most common side effects include headache, cough, nausea and fever.

Damoctocog alfa pegol (antihemophilic factor- recombinant pegylated-aucl) was approved for medical use in the United States in August 2018, and in the European Union in November 2018.


Medical uses 
In the United States damoctocog alfa pegol is indicated for use in previously treated adults and adolescents (twelve years of age and older) with hemophilia A (congenital Factor VIII deficiency) for: (1) On-demand treatment and control of bleeding episodes ; (2) Perioperative management of bleeding; (3) Routine prophylaxis to reduce the frequency of bleeding episodes.

In the European Union, damoctocog alfa pegol is indicated for the treatment and prophylaxis of bleeding in previously treated people twelve years of age and older with haemophilia A (congenital factor VIII deficiency).

References

External links 
 
 
 
 

Antihemorrhagics
Recombinant proteins